Walter Yasuo Oi (July 1, 1929 – December 24, 2013) was the Elmer B. Milliman Professor of Economics at the University of Rochester in Rochester, New York. He was a fellow of the American Academy of Arts and Sciences, a distinguished fellow of the Society of Labor Economists, and a recipient of the Secretary of Defense Medal for Outstanding Public Service. He is credited with providing the economic basis for a voluntary military and the elimination of a draft.

Early life
Oi was born in Los Angeles, California.  He obtained a Ph.D. in Economics from the University of Chicago in 1961.

At age 13, Oi and his family were detained by U.S. authorities and sent along with other Japanese-Americans to an internment camp following the signing of Executive Order 9066. For the first few days of his internment, Oi and his family lived in a stall at Santa Anita Park.

Oi began to lose his sight in the 1960s, as he finished his doctoral work and began searching for a faculty position.

Role in the development of an all volunteer force
In his contribution to The Costs and Implications of an All-Volunteer Force (1967) (of which he was also editor) Oi outlined the different calculations required to differentiate between the budgetary cost of military personnel and the economic cost to the nation of conscription. He identified the hidden costs of drafted force as the impact on the mental well-being of those drafted. Oi estimated the loss in monetary terms of this effect to be between $826 million and $1.134 billion.

Oi was then employed as the staff economist on President Nixon's Commission on an All-Volunteer Armed Force (the Gates  Commission) in the early 1970s. His research was used as a key piece of evidence in the debate to end the policy of conscription. Conscription ended in 1973.

Role in relation to disability
Oi was the vice-chair of the President's Commission on Employment of People with Disabilities.

Awards and honors
Oi was elected a fellow of the American Academy of Arts and Sciences in 1993. Oi was named a distinguished fellow of the American Economic Association, a distinguished fellow of the Society of Labor Economists, and a fellow of the Econometrics Society.  In 2000, Oi received the Secretary of Defense Medal for Outstanding Public Service for his work leading to the adoption of an all-volunteer military.

Personal
During World War II, Oi was interned at the Granada internment camp since he was a Nisei, an American of second generation Japanese descent.

Oi had been gradually losing his sight for the majority of his life and unable to read text since entering college. By 1956, he was totally blind. He continued to teach, collaborate and work until he died, aged 84, in Rochester, New York.

Bibliography

Notes

References

External links
  Profile of Walter Y. Oi from the Department of Defense
  Economics Department Faculty Profile Webpage at the University of Rochester 

1929 births
2013 deaths
American economists
Japanese-American internees
University of Rochester faculty
American academics of Japanese descent
American blind people
Labor economists
Fellows of the American Academy of Arts and Sciences
Fellows of the Econometric Society
Blind academics
Distinguished Fellows of the American Economic Association